Brewarrina Shire is a local government area in the Orana region of New South Wales, Australia. The Shire is located adjacent to the Darling River, which is known as the Barwon River upstream from Bourke; and located adjacent to the Kamilaroi Highway. The northern boundary of the Shire is located adjacent to the border between New South Wales and Queensland. The Shire is a wool and cotton growing area.

Towns and villages
Brewarrina Shire includes Brewarrina and the villages of Gongolgon, Angledool and Goodooga and the ghost town of Tarcoon.

Demographics
According to the Australian Bureau of Statistics during 2003–04, there were 500 wage and salary earners (ranked 163rd in New South Wales and 528th in Australia, less than 0.1% of both New South Wales's 2,558,415 and Australia's 7,831,856) with a total income of $17 million (ranked 162nd in New South Wales and 527nd in Australia, less than 0.1% of both New South Wales's $107 billion and Australia's $304 billion). It was an estimated average income per wage and salary earner of $33,530 (ranked 90th in New South Wales and 302nd in Australia, 81% of New South Wales's $41,407 and 86% of Australia's $38,820) and that median income per wage and salary earner of $32,230 (ranked 73rd in New South Wales and 245th in Australia, 91% of New South Wales's $35,479 and 94% of Australia's $34,149).

Council

Current composition and election method

Brewarrina Shire Council is composed of nine Councillors elected proportionally as a single ward. All Councillors are elected for a fixed four-year term of office. The Mayor is elected by the Councillors at the first meeting of the council. The most recent election was held on 4 December 2021, and the makeup of the council is as follows:

The current Council, elected in 2021, in order of election, is:

See also

List of local government areas in New South Wales

References

 
Local government areas of New South Wales